In American college athletics, a vacated victory is a win that the National Collegiate Athletic Association (NCAA) has stripped from an athletic team, usually as punishment for misconduct related to their sports programs. The team being punished is officially stripped of its victory, but the opposing team retains its loss—thus, vacated victories are different from forfeits, in which the losing team is given the win. The practice of vacating victories has been criticized by players and sports journalists, but remains one of the NCAA's preferred penalties for infractions related to past misconduct. Over 160 college football teams and 270 college basketball teams have had wins vacated.

Definition
A vacated victory is distinct from a forfeit, which simply reverses the outcome of a contest: when a game is forfeited, the team that won records a loss and the team that lost records a win. By comparison, a vacated win only removes regular season and tournament wins from the record of the penalized team. The opposing, non-penalized team retains all losses corresponding to vacated games in the regular season (although tournament losses are stricken).

History
In the process of regulating infractions, the NCAA received complaints that their punishments did not penalize the actual perpetrators. Prospective measures, like scholarship reductions or postseason bans, affected athletes who were unrelated to the original violation. To remedy this, the NCAA’s committee on infractions adopted the practice of vacating wins as a punishment that would be linked to the specific wrongdoers. The NCAA has broad authority to apply this punishment, but is more likely to do in cases of major systemic fraud in a program or where academically ineligible players have competed. When issuing punishments in the past, the NCAA Committee on Infractions ordered that regular season games be forfeited by the offending team while NCAA tournament games be vacated. More recently, forfeits have not been used at all, and both regular season and tournament games have been vacated.

The precise first use of a vacated win as punishment is unclear. According to Sports Reference, the first recorded use of the punishment in college basketball took place after the 1961 NCAA gambling scandal. The Saint Joseph's Hawks had four games in the NCAA tournament vacated, including their third-place finish. 

The first collegiate national title to be vacated was the 1971 men's soccer championship. The Howard Bison were ruled to have fielded ineligible players, although analysts and historians have argued Howard was targeted because of the racial makeup of the team. As of 2018, 20 college programs have had a national title vacated.

The NCAA has vacated wins as a punishment for academic misconduct, impermissible financial benefits, and player sex scandals. After making the punishment official, the NCAA requires schools to return trophies and take down any references to vacated achievements.

Records between teams
By striking the win but not the corresponding loss, vacated victories result in anomalies such as games with losers but no winners, unbalanced series records, and inconsistent measures of head-to-head streaks.

The NCAA does not maintain official records between any two opposing teams, and initially it had no official policy for the treatment of vacated victories in calculating either series records or win/loss streaks between any two opposing teams. Various media outlets commented on the inconsistency between opponents' series records inherent to vacated victories. In June 2009, both the ESPN.com SEC Blog and the Chattanooga Times Free Press discussed NCAA sanctions against the Alabama Crimson Tide football program; each stated that games with vacated wins do not count at all in a series record between two teams. Later, the NCAA's rules were updated to state that "all team and coaches’ streaks (such as wins, postseason appearances, team statistical streaks, and so on) are terminated by the vacancy of a contest."

Criticism
Athletes, administrators, and sports journalists have criticized the practice of vacating wins, arguing that it is arbitrary, confusing, and disproportionate to the infractions it punishes. Those opposed to the punishment note that the NCAA is effectively asking fans and schools to pretend that the game never happened. Former competitors and fans often reject the punishment, saying that the NCAA cannot take away the on-field accomplishments or memories of games.

The practice of vacating victories has also been called insufficiently preventative, as schools are still able to keep money they received from their vacated accomplishments and fans still consider the on-field result to be "real".

In October 2020, the NCAA stripped the UMass women's tennis team of its 2017 Atlantic 10 Conference championship over the improper reimbursement of a $252 phone bill, leading to a public outcry. One writer called the decision the "single worst miscarriage of justice" in the NCAA's history, as the original error was minor and the university had self-reported. The players involved disputed the punishment, arguing that vacating their victories placed them in the same category as cheaters who gained a competitive advantage from misconduct.

Notable punishments
 The NCAA Final Four appearances by Michigan's Fab Five were vacated because of Chris Webber's association with booster Ed Martin.
 After the 1990 men's lacrosse championships, the NCAA vacated Syracuse's victory when they determined that star player Paul Gait was ineligible due to having a car loan co-signed by the coach's wife. Syracuse refused to acknowledge the punishment and the trophy went missing. Syracuse later commissioned a replacement trophy, without the NCAA logo, that the university still displays.
 The 2005 USC vs. Notre Dame football game, famous for the "Bush Push", was later vacated because of monetary benefits Reggie Bush received from sports agents while in college. USC was also forced to vacate their 2005 BCS National Championship win. Notably, despite the NCAA generally only vacating wins, USC claims their loss against Texas in the 2006 Rose Bowl has also been vacated.
 The NCAA stripped former Penn State football head coach Joe Paterno of 111 wins because of the Jerry Sandusky scandal before returning the wins in 2015 as part of a settlement agreement.
 In 2007–08, the Memphis Tigers set an NCAA Division I men's basketball record for wins in a season, led by Derrick Rose and coach John Calipari. The team made it to the finals of the NCAA basketball tournament before losing to Kansas in overtime. All of the wins from that season were later vacated because Rose's SAT score was invalidated, making him an ineligible student-athlete. This was the second Final Four appearance that Calipari had vacated, after the 1996 Final Four with the UMass Minutemen.
 The 2012–13 Louisville Cardinals men were the first Division I basketball team, whether men's or women's, ever stripped of a national title. This was the result of sanctions levied after a program staffer was found to have paid a local madam to provide adult entertainment for players and recruits, rendering several players on the championship team ineligible. These sanctions also caused the Cardinals' 2012 Final Four appearance to be vacated. While the championship remains vacated, a settlement between the NCAA and several Louisville players not implicated in the violations most notably saw the Cardinals' Luke Hancock once again recognized as the 2013 Final Four's Most Outstanding Player.

See also
 List of vacated and forfeited games in college basketball

Notes

References

Sports terminology